Galaxy Star is a singing competition television series broadcast in Myanmar on MRTV-4. The first season of Galaxy Star began airing on 7 April 2017, and has air weekly on Friday evenings at 9:15 on MRTV-4 Channel through September 2017. The series is produced by JBJ Entertainment , in collaboration with Samsung.

Judges

The judges of the first season include notable Burmese musicians, namely Graham, Pho Ka, Sung Thin Par,  Phyu Phyu Kyaw Thein, and J-Me. Korean musicians and artists, namely Kim Hyung-suk, Daehyun of B.A.P (South Korean band), and Minzy, served as guest judges during the first season's Korea Training Camp mission.

Top 10 Contestants
Naw Sel Sel Eh Doe - top 10
Alienz - top 8 
Mee No - top 10
Marco - top 8
John Thanga - top 8
Saw Eh Say Moo - top 5
Honey Tun Wai - top 5
Lar Dint Htar Yi - top 5
Key - runner up
Nay Min Eain - winner

See also
Melody World
Myanmar Idol
Television in Myanmar

References

External links

Burmese television series
Singing competitions
MRTV (TV network) original programming